Betty Davis (born Betty Gray Mabry; July 26, 1944 – February 9, 2022) was an American singer, songwriter, and model. She was known for her controversial sexually-oriented lyrics and performance style and was the second wife of trumpeter Miles Davis. Her AllMusic profile describes her as "a wildly flamboyant funk diva with few equals ... [who] combined the gritty emotional realism of Tina Turner, the futurist fashion sense of David Bowie, and the trendsetting flair of Miles Davis".

Early life 
Betty Gray Mabry was born in Durham, North Carolina, on July 26, 1944. She developed an interest in music when she was about ten, and was introduced to various blues musicians by her grandmother, Beulah Blackwell, while staying at her farm in Reidsville. At 12, she wrote one of her first songs, "I'm Going to Bake That Cake of Love". The family relocated to Homestead, Pennsylvania, so her father, Henry Mabry, could work at a Pennsylvania steel mill. Davis attended and graduated Homestead High School.  She decided to pursue a career in showbusiness after watching her father dance like Elvis Presley.

Career 
When she was 16, Betty left Homestead for New York City, enrolling at the Fashion Institute of Technology (FIT) while living with her aunt. She soaked up the Greenwich Village culture and folk music of the early 1960s. She associated herself with frequenters of the Cellar, a hip uptown club where young and stylish people congregated. It was a multiracial, artsy crowd of models, design students, actors, and singers. At the Cellar she played records and chatted people up. She was a friend and early muse to fashion designer Stephen Burrows, who also studied at the FIT at the time. She also worked as a model, appearing in photo spreads in Seventeen, Ebony and Glamour.

In New York, she met musicians including Jimi Hendrix and Sly Stone. The seeds of her musical career were planted through her friendship with soul singer Lou Courtney, who reputedly produced her first single, "The Cellar", though the existence of that record has been questioned.  She secured a contract with Don Costa, who had written arrangements for Frank Sinatra. As Betty Mabry, she recorded "Get Ready For Betty" b/w "I'm Gonna Get My Baby Back" in 1964 for Costa's DCP International label. Around the same time, she recorded a single, "I'll Be There", with Roy Arlington for Safice Records, under the joint name "Roy and Betty".

Her first professional gig came after she wrote "Uptown (to Harlem)" for the The Chambers Brothers. Their 1967 album was a major success, but Mabry focused on her modeling career. She was successful as a model but felt bored by the work—"I didn't like modeling because you didn't need brains to do it. It's only going to last as long as you look good."

In 1968, when she was in a relationship with Hugh Masekela, she recorded several songs for Columbia Records, with Masekela doing the arrangements. Two of them were released as a single: "Live, Love, Learn" b/w "It's My Life". Her relationship with Miles Davis began soon after her breakup from Masekela.  She featured on the cover of Miles Davis' album Filles de Kilimanjaro, which included his tribute to her, "Mademoiselle Mabry", and she introduced him to psychedelic rock and the flamboyant clothing styles of the era.  In the spring of 1969, Betty returned to Columbia's 52nd St. Studios to record a series of demo tracks, with Miles and Teo Macero producing.  At least five songs were taped during those sessions, three of which were Mabry originals, two of which were covers of Cream and Creedence Clearwater Revival.  Miles attempted to use these demo songs to secure an album deal for Betty, but neither Columbia nor Atlantic were interested and they were archived into a vault until 2016 when they were released in the compilation, The Columbia Years, 1968–1969, by Seattle's Light in the Attic Records.

After the end of her marriage with Miles, Betty moved to London, probably around 1971, to pursue her modeling career. She wrote music while in the UK and, after about a year, returned to the US with the intention of recording songs with Santana. Instead, she recorded her own songs with a group of West Coast funk musicians including Larry Graham, Greg Errico, the Pointer Sisters, and members of Tower of Power.  Davis wrote and arranged all her songs. Her first record, Betty Davis, was released in 1973.   She released two more studio albums, They Say I'm Different (1974) and her major label debut on Island Records Nasty Gal (1975). None of the three albums were a commercial success, but she had two minor hits on the Billboard R&B chart: "If I'm in Luck I Might Get Picked Up", which reached no. 66 in 1973, and "Shut Off the Lights", which reached no. 97 in 1975.

Davis remained a cult figure as a singer, due in part to her unabashedly sexual lyrics and performance style, which were both controversial for the time. She had success in Europe, but in the U.S. she was barred from performing on television because of her sexually aggressive stage persona. Some of her shows were boycotted, and her songs were not played on the radio due to pressure by religious groups and the NAACP. Carlos Santana recalled Betty as "indomitable – she couldn't be tamed. Musically, philosophically and physically, she was extreme and attractive."

Retirement
In 1976, Davis completed another album for Island Records (which was shelved and unreleased for 33 years), before being dropped by the label. She spent a year in Japan, spending time with silent monks. 

In 1980, Davis' father died which prompted her return to the US to live with her mother in Homestead, Pennsylvania. Davis struggled to overcome her father's death, and subsequent mental illness. She acknowledged that she suffered a setback at the time, but stayed in Homestead, accepted the end of her career, and lived a quiet life.

The tracks from Davis' final recording sessions in 1979 were released on two bootleg albums, Crashin' from Passion (1995) and Hangin' Out in Hollywood (1996). A greatest hits album, Anti Love: The Best of Betty Davis, was also released in 1995.

In 2007, Betty Davis (1973) and They Say I'm Different (1974) were reissued by Light in the Attic Records. In 2009, the label reissued Nasty Gal and her unreleased fourth studio album recorded in 1976, re-titled as Is It Love or Desire?. Both reissues contained extensive liner notes and shed some light on the mystery of why her fourth album, considered possibly to be her best work by members of her last band (Herbie Hancock, Chuck Rainey, and Alphonse Mouzon), was shelved and remained unreleased for 33 years.

In 2017, an independent documentary directed by Phil Cox entitled Betty: They Say I'm Different, was released, which renewed interest in her life and music career.
When Cox tracked Davis down, he found her living in the basement of a house with no internet, cell phone, or car. He said: "This wasn't a woman with riches or luxury. She was living on the bare essentials."

In 2019, Davis released "A Little Bit Hot Tonight", her first new song in over 40 years, which was performed and sung by Danielle Maggio, an ethnomusicologist who was a friend and associate producer on Betty: They Say I'm Different.

Personal life and death 
As a model in 1966, Betty met jazz musician Miles Davis, who was 19 years her senior. He was separated from his first wife, dancer Frances Davis, and was dating actress Cicely Tyson. Betty began dating Miles in early 1968, and they were married that September. During their year of marriage, she introduced him to the fashions and popular music trends of the era that influenced his music. In his autobiography, Miles credited Betty with helping to plant the seeds of his further musical explorations by introducing the trumpeter to psychedelic rock guitarist Jimi Hendrix and funk innovator Sly Stone. The Miles Davis album Filles de Kilimanjaro (1968) features Betty on the cover and includes a song named after her.

In his autobiography, Miles said Betty was "too young and wild", and accused her of having an affair with Jimi Hendrix, which hastened the end of their marriage. Betty denied the affair stating, "I was so angry with Miles when he wrote that. It was disrespectful to Jimi and to me. Miles and I broke up because of his violent temper." After accusing her of adultery, he filed for divorce in 1969. Miles told Jet magazine that the divorce was obtained on a "temperament" charge. He added, "I'm just not the kind of cat to be married." Hendrix and Miles remained close, planning to record, until Hendrix's death. The influence of Hendrix and especially Sly Stone on Miles Davis was obvious on the album Bitches Brew (1970), which ushered in the era of jazz fusion.  It has been said that he wanted to call the album Witches Brew but Betty convinced him to change it.

Davis briefly dated musician Eric Clapton, but she refused to collaborate with him.

In 1975 Davis' lover Robert Palmer helped her secure a deal with Island Records. Shortly thereafter she released her album Nasty Gal.

Davis died from cancer at her home in Homestead, Pennsylvania, on February 9, 2022, at the age of 77.

Legacy
The live action/animated TV series Mike Judge Presents: Tales from the Tour Bus ended its 2018 season with an episode focusing on Davis' controversial career.

Davis' music has been featured in television series including Orange Is the New Black, Girlboss,  Mixed-ish, High Fidelity and Pistol.

Discography

Studio albums

Singles

Compilation

Unofficial releases 
Crashin' from Passion (1995) (Razor & Tie) / Hangin' Out in Hollywood (1995) (Charly Records) – Compilation of material recorded in 1979

 Anti Love: The Best of Betty Davis (2001) (MPC limited) – Compilation
 This Is It! Anthology (2005) (Vampisoul) – Compilation

References

Literature 
 Liner notes to Light in the Attic Records' 2007 re-issue of Betty Davis' self-titled 1973 debut album.

External links
 
 Betty Davis at AllAboutJazz
 
 
 Betty Davis on Weave
 Betty: They Say I'm Different – feature documentary, made in collaboration with Betty Davis herself
 The Sound of Young America – interview on Maximum Fun June 21, 2007 (her first radio interview in 30 years)
 The Beautiful Dichotomy of Betty Davis: A Rare Conversation with the Elusive Mistress of Funk – interview on NoDepression, February 2010, by J. Hayes
 Neil Spencer, "Miles Davis: The muse who changed him, and the heady Brew that rewrote jazz", The Guardian, September 5, 2010 (including 2010 interview).
Emily Lordi, "The Artful, Erotic and Still Misunderstood Funk of Betty Davis", New Yorker, May 2, 2018

1944 births
2022 deaths
20th-century African-American women singers
African-American rock musicians
African-American women singer-songwriters
American expatriates in the United Kingdom
American funk singers
American rhythm and blues singer-songwriters
American rock singers
American rock songwriters
American soul singers
Deaths from cancer in Pennsylvania
Fashion Institute of Technology alumni
Female models from North Carolina
Female models from Pittsburgh
Island Records artists
Miles Davis
Musicians from Durham, North Carolina
Musicians from Pittsburgh
People from Homestead, Pennsylvania
Singer-songwriters from North Carolina
Singer-songwriters from Pennsylvania
Light In The Attic Records artists